The 1995–96 OPJHL season is the third season of the Ontario Provincial Junior A Hockey League (OPJHL). The twenty-two teams of the MacKenzie, MacKinnon, Phillips, and Ruddock Divisions competed in a 50-game schedule.  The top 4 teams of each division make the playoffs.

The winner of the OPJHL playoffs, the Newmarket 87's, won the 1996 Buckland Cup as OHA Champions and the Dudley Hewitt Cup as Central Canadian Champions, but failed to win the 1996 Royal Bank Cup.

Changes
League jumps from 2 to 4 divisions.
Barrie Colts leave OPJHL for Ontario Hockey League.
Markham Waxers leave OPJHL for MetJHL.
Bramalea Blues, St. Michael's Buzzers, Mississauga Chargers, and Kingston Voyageurs join OPJHL from MetJHL.
Stouffville Clippers join OPJHL.
Trenton Sting and Bowmanville Eagles join OPJHL from COJCHL.

Final standings
Note: GP = Games played; W = Wins; L = Losses; OTL = Overtime losses; SL = Shootout losses; GF = Goals for; GA = Goals against; PTS = Points; x = clinched playoff berth; y = clinched division title; z = clinched conference title

1995-96 OPJHL Playoffs

Division Semi-final
Bramalea Blues defeated Oakville Blades 4-games-to-1
Brampton Capitals defeated Streetsville 4-games-to-none
Mississauga Chargers defeated St. Michael's Buzzers 4-games-to-3
Milton Merchants defeated Hamilton Kiltys 4-games-to-2
Newmarket 87's defeated Cobourg Cougars 4-games-to-3
Kingston Voyageurs defeated Trenton Sting 4-games-to-none
Orillia Terriers defeated Collingwood Blues 4-games-to-3
Lindsay Muskies defeated Bowmanville Eagles 4-games-to-none
Division Final
Bramalea Blues defeated Milton Merchants 4-games-to-none
Brampton Capitals defeated Mississauga Chargers 4-games-to-none
Newmarket 87's defeated Orillia Terriers 4-games-to-1
Lindsay Muskies defeated Kingston Voyageurs 4-games-to-3
Semi-final
Brampton Capitals defeated Bramalea Blues 4-games-to-3
Newmarket 87's defeated Lindsay Muskies 4-games-to-3
Final
Newmarket 87's defeated Brampton Capitals 4-games-to-2

OHA Buckland Cup and Dudley Hewitt Cup Championship
The 1996 Dudley Hewitt Cup was hosted by the Cobourg Cougars of Cobourg, Ontario.  Both Newmarket and Brampton were granted entry into the event, Newmarket eventually won.

Round Robin
Thunder Bay Flyers (USHL) defeated Cobourg Cougars 5-3
Newmarket 87's defeated Rayside-Balfour Sabrecats (NOJHL) 4-3
Brampton Capitals defeated Thunder Bay Flyers (USHL) 5-2
Cobourg Cougars defeated Rayside-Balfour Sabrecats (NOJHL) 5-3
Brampton Capitals defeated Rayside-Balfour Sabrecats (NOJHL) 10-6
Newmarket 87's defeated Cobourg Cougars 3-1
Brampton Capitals defeated Newmarket 87's 6-3
Thunder Bay Flyers (USHL) defeated Newmarket 87's 3-2
Brampton Capitals defeated Cobourg Cougars 9-3

Semi-final
Brampton Capitals defeated Cobourg Cougars 5-2
Newmarket 87's defeated Thunder Bay Flyers (USHL) 6-3

Final
Newmarket 87's defeated Brampton Capitals 8-2

1996 Royal Bank Cup Championship
The 1996 Royal Bank Cup was hosted by the Melfort Mustangs of Melfort, Saskatchewan.  The Newmarket 87's were defeated in the semi-final.

Round Robin
Newmarket 87's defeated Vernon Vipers (BCHL) 7-5
Newmarket 87's defeated Yorkton Terriers (SJHL) 5-2
Melfort Mustangs (SJHL) defeated Newmarket 87's 11-3
Moncton Beavers (MJAHL) defeated Newmarket 87's 4-3

Semi-final
Vernon Vipers (BCHL) defeated Newmarket 87's 7-4

Scoring leaders
Note: GP = Games played; G = Goals; A = Assists; Pts = Points; PIM = Penalty minutes

See also
 1996 Royal Bank Cup
 Dudley Hewitt Cup
 List of OJHL seasons
 Northern Ontario Junior Hockey League
 Superior International Junior Hockey League
 Greater Ontario Junior Hockey League
 1995 in ice hockey
 1996 in ice hockey

References

External links
 Official website of the Ontario Junior Hockey League
 Official website of the Canadian Junior Hockey League

Ontario Junior Hockey League seasons
OPJHL